Marcelo Arévalo and Miguel Ángel Reyes-Varela were the defending champions but only Reyes-Varela chose to defend his title, partnering Nicolás Barrientos. Reyes-Varela successfully defended his title, defeating Luis David Martínez and Felipe Meligeni Alves 7–6(13–11), 6–2 in the final.

Seeds

Draw

References

External links
 Main draw

San Luis Open Challenger - Doubles
2022 Doubles